Lucerna bainbridgii is a species of air-breathing land snail, a terrestrial pulmonate gastropod mollusk in the family Pleurodontidae.

This species occurs in Jamaica.

References

External links 
 (June) 1895. The Nautilus. page 13.
 Pfeiffer, L. (1845). Descriptions of new species of land shells from the collection of H. Cuming, Esq. Proceedings of the Zoological Society of London. 13 (147): 43–45. London
  Sei M., Robinson D.G., Geneva A.J. & Rosenberg G. (2017). Doubled helix: Sagdoidea is the overlooked sister group of Helicoidea (Mollusca: Gastropoda: Pulmonata). Biological Journal of the Linnean Society. 122(4): 697-728.

Pleurodontidae
Gastropods described in 1845